The Taichung Municipal T̲aic̲hung F̲irst S̲enior H̲igh School (TCFSH; , simply as ) is a senior high school in North District, Taichung, Taiwan. TCFSH was the first high school founded by Taiwanese to educate their youngsters during the colonial days under Taiwan under Japanese rule.

Overview
The admission of Taichung First Senior High School is extremely competitive. Less than top 1% of scorers on the Basic Competence Test for Junior High School Students (國民中學學生基本學力測驗) receive admission. A portion of graduates go on to attend university in Taiwan as well as worldwide, including the Massachusetts Institute of Technology, Stanford University, and the University of California, Berkeley. For many international science and math competitions such as the International Mathematics Olympiad, the International Geography Olympiad, the International Physics Olympiad, the International Biology Olympiad, the Intel Science Fair, the International Chemistry Olympiad, the International Earth Science Olympiad, etc., students from TCFSH are regularly chosen to represent Taiwan.

History 
Taichung First Senior High School was founded by elite members of gentry in Taichung in 1915, including Lin Lie-tang, Lin Hsien-tang (林獻堂), Lin Hsiung-cheng (林熊徵), Tsai Lien-fang and Koo Hsien-jung (辜顯榮).  Fought against the unfair education policy of the Japanese colonial government, they established the Taichung Middle School (台灣公立台中中學校) to provide better education to the young Taiwanese who did not have the opportunity to attend middle schools which were reserved for the Japanese children exclusively.

In 1922, the school was transferred to the Taichung County government and the name was changed to Taichung County Taichung First Middle School (台中州立台中第一中學校). It was the only school which was established exclusively for Taiwanese student when Taiwan was under Japan's rule.
In 1945, Taiwan is free from Japan's rule after World War II, and the school was renamed Taiwan Provincial First High School (台灣省立台中第一中學).
In 1948, The school was elected as one of the 39 best high schools in Taiwan.  The only other high school in Taiwan that received this honor was the Taipei First Girl's High School.
In 1954, a satellite campus was established in Fengyuan City.
In 1987, the mathematic and physics class for gifted students was formed.
In 1996, the art class was formed. It was the first time that girls could be admitted to TCFSH.
In 2000, the name was changed to National Taichung First High School (國立台中第一高級中學).
In 2003, the language gifted class was created.
In 2009, the science class was established. It provided an alternative choice for many talented female students. Some first-tier female students who were qualified for the Taichung Girls High School (TCGS) chose to enroll at TCFSH instead of TCGS.
In 2017, the name was changed to Taichung Municipal Taichung First Senior High School (台中市立台中第一高級中等學校).

Partner Schools
: Lycée Malherbe, Caen, since 2005
: Waseda University Honjo Senior High School, Honjō
: Kobe Municipal Fukiai High School, Kobe
: Incheon Jinsan Science High School, Incheon

Famous alumni

Art
Real Huang (阿沁)- guitarist with the band F.I.R
Lin Hwai-min - choreographer and founder of the Cloud Gate Dance Theater
Hwan Shu-jun (黃舒駿) - singer

Academia
Henry T. Yang -  The chancellor of the University of California, Santa Barbara since 1994. A member of the National Academy of Engineering and a Fellow of the American Institute of Aeronautics and Astronautics.

Politics
 Hsieh Tung-min
 Huang Kuo-shu
 Joseph Wu
 Lee Ying-yuan
 Li Ao
 Mao Chi-kuo
 Wu Den-yih

References

External links 

  Official website in Chinese
  Official website in English

1915 establishments in Taiwan
Educational institutions established in 1915
High schools in Taiwan
Schools in Taichung